Centennial School District may refer to:

 Centennial School District (Minnesota)
 Centennial School District (Oregon)
 Centennial School District (Pennsylvania)

See also
 Centennial Public School (Nebraska)